Tricharina is a genus of fungi in the family Pyronemataceae. The genus has a widespread distribution in temperate regions, and contains 13 species. The anamorph form is Ascorhizoctonia. Tricharina was described by mycologist Finn-Egil Eckblad in 1968.

Species
T. ascophanoides
T. cretea
T. flava
T. gilva
T. groenlandica
T. hiemalis
T. japonica
T. mariae
T. ochroleuca
T. pallidisetosa
T. praecox
T. striispora
T. obispora

References

Pezizales genera
Pyronemataceae